DJ Clazzi (born Kim Sung-hoon; 15 November 1974), better known simply by his stage name Clazzi, is a South Korean composer, singer, lyricist, record producer and DJ. He is the leader of the South Korean electropop band Clazziquai, that was formed in 2001 and debuted in 2004 with the album Instant Pig. In January 2012, he made his solo debut with Infant, an album that includes collaborations with a number of artists, including Seulong of 2AM and members of Sunny Hill.

Biography

Early life
Kim Sung-hoon was born in South Korea on 15 November 1974. He moved to Canada to attend Capilano University in British Columbia, where he majored in music technology.

Debut with Clazziquai (2001–2010)
DJ Clazzi formed the group Clazziquai with singers Alex and Horan in 2001. They began releasing music on the Internet that resulted in the release of their first studio album Instant Pig, which appeared on 14 May 2004 by the label Seoul Record (now LOEN Entertainment) in South Korea. It was also released later that year in Japan by Avex Trax, and in Taiwan under Avex Taiwan.

The group released their second album Color Your Soul on 22 September 2005, and a third titled Love Child of the Century on 7 June 2007. Their most recent studio album is Mucho Punk, released on 14 July 2009. Between studio albums, the group has also released a number of remix albums.

Solo debut (2011–present)
In 2011, DJ Clazzi began collaborating with various South Korean artists. He first collaborated with 2AM singer Seulong, who provided the vocals for the single "How We Feel." Shortly after that, he released the single "Love & Hate," a collaboration with Yi Sung Yol and rapper MYK.

DJ Clazzi initially planned on releasing his debut solo album in December 2011. On 17 January 2012, he released the full-length album Infant through the label LOEN Entertainment. Although all of the songs on the album have vocals, all of them are from other artists. Along with Seulong, Yi Sung-yol, and MYK, the album also features singers Whale of the group W&Whale, Jinsil, Hyun-song and Su-ryun of The Koxx, Christina, Kim Wan-sung, Jang Woo-hyuk and Cho Hyun-a of Urban Zakapa and Kota and Jubi of Sunny Hill.

Clazziquai released their studio album Blessed on 5 February 2013.

Musical style

DJ Clazzi's music is described in general as electronica or electronic music. When asked to define his music genre in an interview, he stated, "I, as a maker of this music, find it hard to tell which genre it is," and that "it should be for the listener to decide."

He has named the English rock band Pink Floyd as his biggest inspiration.

Discography

Studio albums

Singles

References

External links
 Clazziquai website

1974 births
Living people
South Korean musicians
South Korean electronic musicians
Capilano University alumni
Clazziquai Project members